Align Aerospace, formerly Anixter Aerospace Hardware and Anixter Pentacon, is a supplier of fasteners, seals, bearings, and related components to aerospace and defense original equipment manufacturers and their subcontractors. Align is headquartered in Chatsworth, California, with European sales and operations office in Collegien, France.

The company was founded in 1972 and has been working in the aerospace and defense industry for the duration of its history.

Ownership
In August 2011, Align was sold by Anixter International (NYSE: AXE), based in Glenview, Illinois,  to the private equity firm Greenbriar Equity.  In March 2015, AVIC International acquired Align Aerospace from Greenbriar.

References

External links
Align Aerospace

Aerospace companies of the United States
Defense companies of the United States
Technology companies established in 1972
Manufacturing companies based in Los Angeles
1972 establishments in California
AVIC aircraft
Chatsworth, Los Angeles